Francisco Diego Aguilar (born 12 June 1972) is a Mexican politician affiliated with the Party of the Democratic Revolution. As of 2014 he served as Deputy of the LIX Legislature of the Mexican Congress representing the Federal District as replacement of Gilberto Ensástiga.

References

1972 births
Living people
Politicians from Mexico City
Party of the Democratic Revolution politicians
20th-century Mexican politicians
Deputies of the LIX Legislature of Mexico
Members of the Chamber of Deputies (Mexico) for Mexico City